Golești is a commune located in Vâlcea County, Muntenia, Romania. It is composed of eleven villages: Aldești, Blidari, Coasta, Drăgănești, Gibești, Giurgiuveni, Opătești, Poenița, Popești (the commune centre), Tulei-Câmpeni, and Vătășești.

References

External links 
 September 1, 2013 - Over 50 kilograms of Ottoman silver coins were discovered by a local in Golești

Communes in Vâlcea County
Localities in Muntenia